Alexander Grigorievich Schlichter (Ukrainian: Александр Григорьевич Шлихтер; 1 September 1868 – 2 December 1940) was a Ukrainian Bolshevik politician, Soviet statesman, political scientist and economist.

Schlichter's grandfather, originally from western Germany (Württemberg), settled in what is the present-day Poltava Oblast of Ukraine in 1818. Schlichter was ethnically one-quarter German and three-fourths Ukrainian.

Following studies at Kharkiv University, Schlichter joined a student the social democratic circle in 1891. He was involved in the technical production of the illegal Bolshevik paper Proletary while it appeared in the Russian Empire (1904–1906).

After the Bolshevik seizure of power he succeeded Vladimir Milyutin as People's Commissar for Agriculture. He also was People's Commissar for Food of the R.S.F.S.R., Commissar Extraordinary for Food in Siberia. In 1919, he became People's Commissar for Food of Ukraine.

In 1920, he was Chairman of the Tambov Gubernia Executive Committee, and was involved in suppression of the Tambov Rebellion.

In April 1927 he attended the Fourth Congress of Soviets as commissar of agriculture in the Ukrainian Republic. There, he described 10% of the rural population of Ukraine as being "surplus".

After 1930 he was mostly involved in scientific activity. He was a full member of the Communist Academy from 1930, an Academician of the Academy of Sciences of the Ukrainian SSR and from 1928, Academician of the Academy of Sciences of the Byelorussian SSR from 1933. He became a Doctor of Economics in 1936. From 1931 to 1938, Schlichter was Vice-President of Ukrainian Academy of Sciences, at the same time the director of the All-Ukrainian Institute of Marxism-Leninism and then president of the All-Ukrainian Association of Marxist–Leninist Institutions (VUAMLIN) from 1930 to 1936. 

He was one of the initiators and active supporters of promoting the theories of Trofim Lysenko.

References

1868 births
1940 deaths
People from Lubny
People from Poltava Governorate
Russian people of German descent
Ukrainian people of German descent
National University of Kharkiv alumni
University of Bern alumni
Russian Social Democratic Labour Party members
Russian exiles to the Russian North
Russian exiles to Siberia
Inmates of Kosoi Kaponir Fortress
Old Bolsheviks
Communist Party of the Soviet Union members
Land cultivation ministers of Russia
Food provision ministers of Russia
Food provision ministers of Ukraine
Land cultivation ministers of Ukraine
Academicians of the Byelorussian SSR Academy of Sciences
Members of the National Academy of Sciences of Ukraine
Institute of History of the Party (Ukraine) directors

Ukrainian Marxists
People's commissars and ministers of the Russian Soviet Federative Socialist Republic
Soviet economists
Ukrainian political scientists
20th-century Ukrainian economists